Simon John Meredith Smith  (born 14 January 1958) is a British diplomat, most recently the ambassador (now retired) to the Republic of Korea (South Korea).

Early life
Smith attended the Triple C School in Grand Cayman, then Clifton College. From Wadham College, Oxford, he gained a BA in Modern Languages in 1980.

Career
From 1981 to 1986 Smith worked at the Department of Employment. He joined Her Majesty's Diplomatic Service in 1986 and has held positions in London, Tokyo, and as Counsellor (Economic/Commercial) in Moscow 1998–2002.

Ambassador
From 2007 to 2012 Smith served as Ambassador to Austria, based in Vienna, and as the UK's representative to many UN and international organisations in Vienna, including as the UK's Governor on the Board of the International Atomic Energy Agency. His transfer to Kyiv as Ambassador to Ukraine was announced on 13 October 2011 and he took up the appointment in 2012. He was replaced in 2015. After a brief spell in London and Korean language training, he was appointed Ambassador to South Korea and took up the post in March 2018.

Personal life
Smith married Sian Stickings in 1984. She was appointed MBE "for services to the local and British communities in Russia" in the 2003 New Year Honours, following Smith's service in Moscow. They have two daughters.

References

 SMITH, Simon John Meredith, Who's Who 2012, A & C Black, 2012; online edn, Oxford University Press, Dec 2011, accessed 27 Aug 2012

Video clips
 IAEA in September 2010
 Green roof on the embassy in June 2010

1958 births
Living people
People educated at Clifton College
Alumni of Wadham College, Oxford
Ambassadors of the United Kingdom to Austria
Permanent Representatives of the United Kingdom to the United Nations
Ambassadors of the United Kingdom to Ukraine
Ambassadors of the United Kingdom to South Korea
Companions of the Order of St Michael and St George